Memecylon elaeagni is a species of plant in the family Melastomataceae. It is endemic to Seychelles.

References

elaeagni
Vulnerable plants
Endemic flora of Seychelles
Taxonomy articles created by Polbot